West Virginia Route 63 is an east–west state highway located within Greenbrier County, West Virginia. The western terminus of the route is at West Virginia Route 12 in Alderson. The eastern terminus is at U.S. Route 60 in Caldwell. From Alderson to Ronceverte, it is known as the Highland Trail.

Route 63 is concurrent with U.S. Route 219 from Ronceverte to near Organ Cave.  It crosses the Greenbrier River during this concurrency.

Major intersections

References

063
Transportation in Greenbrier County, West Virginia